In theology, general revelation, or natural revelation, refers to God's revelation "made to all men everywhere", discovered through natural means, such as observation of nature (the physical universe), philosophy, and reasoning. Christian theologians use the term to describe knowledge of God purported to be plainly available to all mankind. General revelation is usually understood to pertain to outward temporal events that are experienced within the world or the physical universe. The definition may be extended to include human conscience or providence or providential history.

Characteristics
General revelation is a form of revelation that gives knowledge through experience or records of history, creation, and innate conscience. Christian theologians cite biblical references to support general revelation: Romans 1:20, Psalms 19:1-6, and Matthew 5:45. General revelation shows the works and existence of God in indirect ways. 

General revelation is experienced through:
 Physical Universe - The laws and nature of the physical universe as it transpires are interpreted as displaying God's attributes of existence, knowledge, wisdom, power, order, greatness, supremacy, righteousness, and goodness.
 Human Conscience - God has instilled the innate ability in all persons to discern the difference between right and wrong, to choose and act on that discernment and judgment according to free will and conscience, and to experience guilt when the act or choice is wrong. One of the arguments for the existence of God is based on the moral sense in humans.
 Providence refers to the sustaining power of God. Providence is defined as "divine providence; proceeding from divine direction or superintendence; as the providential contrivance of things; as a providential escape from danger."

General revelation is understood as the everyday experience of life, but is solely dependent on  interpretation of those experiences as comprehending God's hand in external events or things. 

General revelation is distinguished from special revelation and direct revelation. The former refers to the knowledge of God and spiritual matters which can be discovered through supernatural means, such as scripture or miracles, and the latter refers to direct communication from God to a person.

According to Dumitru Stăniloae, the Eastern Orthodox Church’s position on general / special revelation is in stark contrast to Protestant and Catholic theologies that see a clear difference between general and special revelation and tend to argue that the former is not sufficient to salvation. In Orthodox Christianity, he argues, there is no separation between the two and supernatural revelation merely embodies the former in historical persons and actions.

See also
 Special revelation
 Biblical inspiration
 Continuous revelation
 Private revelation
 Theophany

Footnotes

References
 Olaf Pedersen (1992), The Book of Nature, Vatican Observatory Publications , distributed by University of Notre Dame  Press.

External links
 Scripture and general revelation, by Andrew S. Kulikovsky at the Creation Ministries International website - a discussion of the evangelical notion of revelation in contrast to the common understanding.

Revelation
Christian terminology